The 2003 Borno State gubernatorial election occurred on April 19, 2003. Incumbent Governor, ANPP's Ali Modu Sheriff won election for a second term, defeating AD's Mala Kachalla and three other candidates. Sheriff allegedly sought for Boko Haram's assistance to win the election.

Ali Modu Sheriff emerged the ANPP candidate in the gubernatorial primary election. His running mate was Adamu Shettima Yuguda Dibal.

Electoral system
The Governor of Borno State is elected using the plurality voting system.

Results
A total of four candidates registered with the Independent National Electoral Commission to contest in the election. ANPP candidate, Ali Modu Sheriff, defeated the Incumbent Governor and three others to win the election.

The total number of registered voters in the state was 2,156,019. However, only 37.92% (i.e. 817,533) of registered voters participated in the exercise.

References 

Borno State gubernatorial elections
Borno State gubernatorial election